Rodney Stepp (born September 29, 1952) is an American keyboardist, songwriter, producer, and entrepreneur. As a jazz, R&B/soul performer, Stepp's musical career has spanned more than 50 years, performing alongside artists such as Michael Jackson, Babyface, The Spinners, Wayman Tisdale, and Mary Wilson.

Biography

1960s
Stepp attended and graduated from Crispus Attucks High School in Indianapolis, Indiana. While there, he formed his first group, The Diplomatics (dba The Diplomats), with Miles "Butch" Loyd. The Diplomatics released one 45 on Herb Miller's LAMP imprint, "Hum Bug", and later went on to record for the Knaptown label under the name Jazzie Cazzie and The Seven Sounds. Their music has been sampled by Egon (on his Curse of the Evil Badger LP) and Koushik.

1970s: The Spinners and Rapture
Stepp played as keyboardist for the backing band of The Spinners, and occasionally conducted the orchestra and rhythm section for the group, performing across the United States, Europe, Asia and Africa. Stepp can be seen in Muhammad Ali's full-length documentary, When We Were Kings, in clips of the Rumble In The Jungle in Zaire, where The Spinners performed. Stepp also appears on The Spinners: Live album recorded at the Latin Casino. He performs an organ solo on The Spinners' hit "Mighty Love". He later re-joined the group when they opened for Jay Leno at Caesars Palace, in October 1999, and again in 2004 at The Snake Pit Ball (Indy 500) in Indianapolis. During this time he appeared on several TV shows including Merv Griffin, Johnny Carson, Soundstage, Soul Train, Dinah Shore, Rock Concert, Midnight Special, Mike Douglas, Night Dreams, an NBC Special hosted by David Nelson, and the Grammy Awards live in 1976 and 1977.

After ending his tenure with The Spinners, Stepp returned to Indianapolis to lead a new band, Rapture, comprising Stepp, Jay Majors, Harry Eaton, Herman Walker, Jr., Lonnie Williams, Rodney Vorhis, Greg Russell, and Tony Hayes, who had between them appeared in bands such as The Diplomats, The Sonic Sounds, The Implements, and The Soul Perfections, and would go on to perform with New Birth, Leroy Hutson and Betty Wright.

In 1978, Rapture auditioned for a production deal on the newly revived American Recording Company, and they left behind their families and jobs to pursue a career in California. However, within six months, the band's projects were shelved, and the group members returned to Indianapolis, performing for another two years before disbanding.

1980s
After Rapture, Stepp began creating music by himself, and in 1984 he had an international dance hit entitled "Break Out" on the Chique record label.

He also incorporated Brooks Street Music (now Rodney Stepp Music Productions), a recording studio and music production house named after the street in Indianapolis where he grew up. He started in his basement in 1984 with two childhood friends, Pheldon Majors and James Walker, Jr., and the studio has grown into a full recording studio.

1990s
In the 90s Stepp expanded his company into the corporate music arena. Brooks Street Music became a creative production house providing music for radio jingles, TV advertisements, film, and corporate presentations. His corporate clients have included The Children's Museum of Indianapolis, Indianapolis Downtown, Inc., the Indiana Pacers, the Kentucky Lottery, the Hoosier Lottery, Hardee's, Holiday Inn, ESPN, WXIN (Fox 59), Corporate Creations and United Airlines.

2000s and 2010s
At the end of 1999, Stepp assembled four session musicians to form Rodney Stepp & BSB, with Steve Cooper on trumpet, flugelhorn and EVI (Electronic Valve Instrument), brothers Bruce Lismon on drums and Koknosh Lismon on bass, and Lloyd Joe Logan on keyboards. The group's debut album, Steppin' Out, received airplay on smooth jazz format stations.

In July 2005, Stepp received the United States Congressional Record Award, as well as the Distinguished Citizens Award from the Mayor of Indianapolis, Bart Peterson and the Distinguished Hoosier Award from Indiana Governor Mitch Daniels.

In fall 2010, Stepp launched multiple music ventures with Kareem Lee, President and CEO of Simple Life Records, including LeStep Licensing in January 2010, a music solutions agent providing pre-recorded and custom-scored tracks to clients in film, TV, advertising, website, video game, branding and other multimedia markets. Stepp is one of the flagship artists on the label's Simple Life Soul brand. He writes and produces music for his label-mates Joon Walker and Abri Mills, who were preparing to release their debut albums in 2012.

In 2020, Stepp was diagnosed with COVID-19.

Discography

References

 Know Your Entertainers: http://www.rodneystepp.com/media_press/media-1986-10-18.pdf
 Eternal Funk - review of "Soul and Funk: The Naptown Sound": http://maryleepappas.blogspot.com/2005/04/eternal-funk-review-of-soul-and-funk.html
 Former Keyboardist for R&B legends The Spinners Receives Congressional Award Among Many Honors: http://www.rodneystepp.com/media_press/press-2005-07-28.pdf
 See Rodney Stepp Play Zaire in 1974: http://blogs.indystar.com/sounds/2010/12/02/see-rodney-stepp-play-zaire-in-1974/

American keyboardists
1952 births
Living people
American male songwriters
American record producers